Asymmetric warfare (or asymmetric engagement) is a type of war between belligerents whose relative military power, strategy or tactics differ significantly. This is typically a war between a standing, professional army and an insurgency or resistance movement militias who may have the status of unlawful combatants.

Asymmetrical warfare can also describe a conflict in which belligerents' resources are uneven, consequently, they both may attempt to exploit each other's relative weaknesses. Such struggles often involve unconventional warfare, with the weaker side attempting to use strategy to offset deficiencies in the quantity or quality of their forces and equipment. Such strategies may not necessarily be militarized. This is in contrast to symmetrical warfare, where two powers have comparable military power, resources, and rely on similar tactics.

Asymmetric warfare is a form of irregular warfare – conflicts in which enemy combatants are not regular military forces of nation-states. The term is frequently used to describe what is also called guerrilla warfare, insurgency, counterinsurgency, rebellion, terrorism, and counter-terrorism.

Definition and differences
The popularity of the term dates from Andrew J. R. Mack's 1975 article "Why Big Nations Lose Small Wars" in World Politics, in which "asymmetric" referred simply to a significant disparity in power between opposing actors in a conflict. "Power", in this sense, is broadly understood to mean material power, such as a large army, sophisticated weapons, an advanced economy, and so on. Mack's analysis was largely ignored in its day, but the end of the Cold War sparked renewed interest among academics. By the late 1990s, new research building off Mack's works was beginning to mature, and after 2004, the U.S. military began once again to prioritize responding to challenges presented by asymmetric warfare.

Since 2004, the discussion of asymmetric warfare has been complicated by the tendency of academic and military officials to use the term in different ways, as well as by its close association with guerrilla warfare, insurgency, terrorism, counterinsurgency, and counter-terrorism. Military authors tend to use the term "asymmetric" to refer to the indirect nature of the strategies many weak actors adopt, or to the nature of the adversary itself (e.g., "asymmetric adversaries can be expected to …") rather than to the relative strength of adversarial forces.

Academic authors tend to focus on explaining two puzzles in asymmetric conflict. First, if "power" determines victory in conflict, then there must be reasons for why weaker actors decide to fight stronger actors. Key explanations include:
 Weaker actors may have secret weapons.
 Weaker actors may have powerful allies.
 Stronger actors are unable to make threats credible.
 The demands of a stronger actor are extreme.
 The weaker actor must consider its regional rivals when responding to threats from powerful actors.

Second, if "power", as generally understood, leads to victory in war, then there must be an explanation for why the "weak" are able to defeat the "strong." Key explanations include:
 Strategic interaction.
 Willingness of the weak to suffer more or bear higher costs.
 External support of weak actors.
 Reluctance to escalate violence on the part of strong actors.
 Internal group dynamics.
 Inflated strong actor war aims.
 Evolution of asymmetric rivals' attitudes towards time.

Asymmetric conflicts include both interstate and civil wars, and over the past two hundred years have generally been won by strong actors. Since 1950, however, weak actors have won the majority of asymmetric conflicts.

Strategic basis
In most conventional warfare, the belligerents deploy forces of a similar type and the outcome can be predicted by the quantity or quality of the opposing forces, for example better command and control of their forces (c2). There are times where this is the case and conventional forces are not easily compared, making it difficult for opposing sides to engage. An example of this is the standoff between the continental land forces of the French Army and the maritime forces of the United Kingdom's Royal Navy during the French Revolutionary and Napoleonic Wars. In the words of Admiral Jervis during the campaigns of 1801, "I do not say, my Lords, that the French will not come. I say only they will not come by sea", and a confrontation that Napoleon Bonaparte described as that between the elephant and the whale.

Tactical basis

The tactical success of asymmetric warfare is dependent on at least some of the following assumptions:
 One side can have a technological advantage that outweighs the numerical advantage of the enemy; the decisive English longbow at the Battle of Crécy is an example.
 Technological superiority usually is canceled by more vulnerable infrastructure which can be targeted with devastating results. Destruction of multiple electric lines, roads, or water supply systems in highly populated areas could have devastating effects on the economy and morale. In contrast, the weaker side may not have these structures at all.
 Training and tactics and technology can prove decisive and allow a smaller force to overcome a much larger one. For example, for several centuries the Greek hoplite's (heavy infantry) use of phalanx made them far superior to their enemies. The Battle of Thermopylae, which also involved good use of terrain, is a well-known example.
 If the inferior power is in a position of self-defense; i.e., under attack or occupation, it may be possible to use unconventional tactics, such as hit-and-run and selective battles in which the superior power is weaker, as an effective means of harassment without violating the laws of war. Perhaps the classical historical examples of this doctrine may be found in the American Revolutionary War, movements in World War II, such as the French Resistance and Soviet and Yugoslav partisans. Against democratic aggressor nations, this strategy can be used to play on the electorate's patience with the conflict (as in the Vietnam War, and others since) provoking protests, and consequent disputes among elected legislators.
 If the inferior power is in an aggressive position, however, and/or turns to tactics prohibited by the laws of war (jus in bello), its success depends on the superior power's refraining from like tactics. For example, the law of land warfare prohibits the use of a flag of truce or clearly marked medical vehicles as cover for an attack or ambush. Still, an asymmetric combatant using this prohibited tactic to its advantage depends on the superior power's obedience to the corresponding law. Similarly, laws of warfare prohibit combatants from using civilian settlements, populations or facilities as military bases, but when an inferior power uses this tactic, it depends on the premise that the superior power will respect the law that the other is violating, and will not attack that civilian target, or if they do the propaganda advantage will outweigh the material loss.

Terrorism
There are two different viewpoints on the relationship between asymmetric warfare and terrorism. In the modern context, asymmetric warfare is increasingly considered a component of fourth generation warfare. When practiced outside the laws of war, it is often defined as terrorism, though rarely by its practitioners or their supporters. The other view is that asymmetric warfare, does not coincide with terrorism.

Use of terrain
Terrain that limits mobility, such as forests and mountains, can be used as a force multiplier by the smaller force and as a force inhibitor against the larger force, especially one operating far from its logistical base. Such terrain is called difficult terrain. Urban areas, though generally having good transport access, provide innumerable ready-made defensible positions with easy escape routes, and can also become difficult terrain if prolonged combat fills the streets with rubble.

An early example of terrain advantage is the Battle of Thermopylae, 480 BC, where the narrow terrain of a defile was used to funnel the Persian forces, who were numerically superior, to a point where they could not use their size as an advantage.

In 12th century, irregulars known as the Assassins were successful in the Nizari Ismaili state. The "state" consisted of fortresses (such as the Alamut Castle) built on strategic mountaintops and highlands with difficult access, surrounded by hostile lands. The Assassins developed tactics to eliminate high-value targets that posed a threat to their security, including the Crusaders.

In the American Revolutionary War, Patriot Lieutenant Colonel Francis Marion, known as the "Swamp Fox", took advantage of irregular tactics, interior lines, and the wilderness of colonial South Carolina to stymie larger British regular forces.

Yugoslav Partisans, starting as small detachments around mountain villages in 1941, fought the German and other Axis occupation forces, successfully taking advantage of the rough terrain to survive despite their small numbers. Over the next four years, they slowly forced their enemies back, recovering population centers and resources, eventually growing into the regular Yugoslav Army.

Role of civilians
Civilians can play an important role in determining the outcome of an asymmetric war. In such conflicts, when it is easy for insurgents to quickly assimilate into the population after an attack, tips on the timing or location of insurgent activity can greatly undermine the resistance. An information-centric framework, in which civilians are seen primarily as sources of strategic information rather than resources, provides a paradigm to better understand the dynamics of such conflicts where civilian information-sharing is important. The framework assumes that:
 The consequential action of noncombatants (civilians) is information sharing, rather than supplying resources, recruits, or shelter to combatants.
 Information can be shared anonymously, without endangering the civilian who relays it.
Given the additional assumption that the larger or dominant force is the government, the framework suggests the following implications:
 Civilians receive services from both government and rebel forces as an incentive to share valuable information.
 Rebel violence can be reduced if the government provides services.
 Provision of security and services are complementary in reducing violence.
 Civilian casualties reduce civilian support to the perpetrating group.
 Provision of information is strongly correlated with the level of anonymity that can be ensured.

A survey of empirical literature on conflict, does not provide conclusive evidence on the aforementioned claims. But the framework provides a starting point to further explore the role of civilian information sharing in asymmetric warfare.

War by proxy
Where asymmetric warfare is carried out (generally covertly) by allegedly non-governmental actors who are connected to or sympathetic to a particular nation's (the "state actor's") interest, it may be deemed war by proxy. This is typically done to give deniability to the state actor. The deniability can be important to keep the state actor from being tainted by the actions, to allow the state actor to negotiate in apparent good faith by claiming they are not responsible for the actions of parties who are merely sympathizers, or to avoid being accused of belligerent actions or war crimes. If proof emerges of the true extent of the state actor's involvement, this strategy can backfire; for example see Iran-contra and Philip Agee.

Examples

American Revolutionary War
From its initiation, the American Revolutionary War was, necessarily, a showcase for asymmetric techniques. In the 1920s, Harold Murdock of Boston attempted to solve the puzzle of the first shots fired on Lexington Green, and came to the suspicion that the few score militia men who gathered before sunrise to await the arrival of hundreds of well-prepared British soldiers were sent specifically to provoke an incident which could be used for Patriot propaganda purposes. The return of the British force to Boston following the search operations at Concord was subject to constant skirmishing, using partisan forces gathered from communities all along the route, making maximum use of the terrain (particularly trees and stone field walls) to overcome the limitations of their weapons – muskets with an effective range of only about 50–70 metres. Throughout the war, skirmishing tactics against British troops on the move continued to be a key factor in the Patriots' success; particularly in the Western theater of the American Revolutionary War.

Another feature of the long march from Concord was the urban warfare technique of using buildings along the route as additional cover for snipers. When revolutionary forces forced their way into Norfolk, Virginia, and used waterfront buildings as cover for shots at British vessels out in the river, the response of destruction of those buildings was ingeniously used to the advantage of the rebels, who encouraged the spread of fire throughout the largely Loyalist town, and spread propaganda blaming it on the British. Shortly afterwards they destroyed the remaining houses, on the grounds that they might provide cover for British soldiers.

The rebels also adopted a form of asymmetric sea warfare, by using small, fast vessels to avoid the Royal Navy, and capturing or sinking large numbers of merchant ships; however the Crown responded by issuing letters of marque permitting private armed vessels to undertake similar attacks on Patriot shipping. John Paul Jones became notorious in Britain for his expedition from France in the little sloop of war Ranger in April 1778, during which, in addition to his attacks on merchant shipping, he made two landings on British soil. The effect of these raids, particularly when coupled with his capture of the Royal Navy's  – the first such success in British waters, but not Jones' last – was to force the British government to increase resources for coastal defense, and to create a climate of fear among the British public which was subsequently fed by press reports of his preparations for the 1779 Bonhomme Richard mission.

From 1776, the conflict turned increasingly into a proxy war on behalf of France, following a strategy proposed in the 1760s but initially resisted by the idealistic young King Louis XVI, who came to the throne at the age of 19 a few months before Lexington. France ultimately drove Great Britain to the brink of defeat by entering the war(s) directly, on several fronts throughout the world.

American Civil War

The American Civil War saw the rise of asymmetric warfare in the Border States, and in particular on the US Western Territorial Border after the Kansas-Nebraska Act of 1854 opened the territories to voting on the expansion of slavery beyond the Missouri Compromise lines. Political implications of this broken 1820s compromise were nothing less than the potential expansion of slavery all across the North American continent, including the northern reaches of the annexed Mexican territories to California and Oregon. So the stakes were high and it caused a flood of immigration to the border: some to grab land and expand slavery west, others to grab land and vote down the expansion of slavery. The pro-slavery land grabbers began asymmetric violent attacks against the more pacifist abolitionists who had settled Lawrence and other territorial towns for suppressing slavery. John Brown, the abolitionist, traveled to Osawatomie in the Kansas Territory expressly to foment retaliatory attacks back against the pro-slavery guerrillas who, by 1858, had twice ransacked both Lawrence and Osawatomie (where one of Brown's sons was shot dead).

The abolitionists would not return the attacks and Brown theorized that a violent spark set off on "the Border" would be a way to finally ignite his long hoped-for slave rebellion. Brown had broad-sworded slave owners at Potawatomi Creek, so the bloody civilian violence was initially symmetrical; however, once the American Civil War ignited in 1861, and when the state of Missouri voted overwhelmingly not to secede from the Union, the pro-slavers on the MO-KS border were driven either south to Arkansas and Texas, or underground—where they became guerrilla fighters and "Bushwhackers" living in the bushy ravines throughout northwest Missouri across the (now) state line from Kansas. The bloody "Border War" lasted all during the Civil War (and long after with guerrilla partisans like the James brothers cynically robbing and murdering, aided and abetted by lingering lost causers). Tragically the Western Border War was an asymmetric war: pro-slavery guerrillas and paramilitary partisans on the pro-Confederate side attacking pro-Union townspeople and commissioned Union military units; with the Union army trying to keep both in check: blocking Kansans and pro-Union Missourians from organizing militarily against the marauding Bushwhackers.

The worst act of domestic terror in US history came in August 1863 when paramilitary guerrillas amassed 350 strong and rode all night 50 miles across eastern Kansas to the abolitionist stronghold of Lawrence (a political target) and destroyed the town, gunning down 150 civilians. The Confederate officer whose company had joined Quantrill's Raiders that day witnessed the civilian slaughter and forbade his soldiers from joining in the carnage. The commissioned officer refused to participate in Quantrill's asymmetric warfare on civilians.

Philippine–American War

The Philippine–American War (1899–1902) was an armed conflict between the United States and Filipino revolutionaries. Estimates of the Filipino forces vary between 100,000 and 1,000,000, with tens of thousands of auxiliaries. Lack of weapons and ammunition was a significant impediment to the Filipinos, so most of the forces were only armed with bolo knives, bows and arrows, spears and other primitive weapons that, in practice, proved vastly inferior to U.S. firepower.

The goal, or end-state, sought by the First Philippine Republic was a sovereign, independent, socially stable Philippines led by the ilustrado (intellectual) oligarchy. Local chieftains, landowners, and businessmen were the principales who controlled local politics. The war was strongest when illustrados, principales, and peasants were unified in opposition to annexation. The peasants, who provided the bulk of guerrilla manpower, had interests different from their illustrado leaders and the principales of their villages. Coupled with the ethnic and geographic fragmentation, unity was a daunting task. The challenge for Aguinaldo and his generals was to sustain unified Filipino public opposition; this was the revolutionaries' strategic center of gravity. The Filipino operational center of gravity was the ability to sustain its force of 100,000 irregulars in the field. The Filipino general Francisco Macabulos described the Filipinos' war aim as, "not to vanquish the U.S. Army but to inflict on them constant losses." They initially sought to use conventional tactics and an increasing toll of U.S. casualties to contribute to McKinley's defeat in the 1900 presidential election. Their hope was that as president the avowedly anti-imperialist future Secretary of state William Jennings Bryan would withdraw from the Philippines. They pursued this short-term goal with guerrilla tactics better suited to a protracted struggle. While targeting McKinley motivated the revolutionaries in the short term, his victory demoralized them and convinced many undecided Filipinos that the United States would not depart precipitously. For most of 1899, the revolutionary leadership had viewed guerrilla warfare strategically only as a tactical option of final recourse, not as a means of operation which better suited their disadvantaged situation. On November 13, 1899, Emilio Aguinaldo decreed that guerrilla war would henceforth be the strategy. This made American occupation of the Philippine archipelago all the more difficult over the next few years. In fact, during just the first four months of the guerrilla war, the Americans had nearly 500 casualties. The Philippine Revolutionary Army began staging bloody ambushes and raids, such as the guerrilla victories at Paye, Catubig, Makahambus, Pulang Lupa, Balangiga and Mabitac. At first, it even seemed as if the Filipinos would fight the Americans to a stalemate and force them to withdraw. President McKinley even considered this at the beginning of the phase. The shift to guerrilla warfare drove the US Army to adopt counter-insurgency tactics. Civilians were given identification and forced into concentration camps with a publicly announced deadline after which all persons found outside of camps without identification would be shot on sight. Thousands of civilians died in these camps due to poor conditions.

20th century

Second Boer War
Asymmetric warfare featured prominently during the Second Boer War. After an initial phase, which was fought by both sides as a conventional war, the British captured Johannesburg, the Boers' largest city, and captured the capitals of the two Boer Republics. The British then expected the Boers to accept peace as dictated by them in the traditional European manner. However instead of capitulating, the Boers fought a protracted guerrilla war. 20,000-30,000 Boer guerrillas were only defeated after the British brought to bear 450,000 imperial troops, about ten times as many as were used in the conventional phase of the war. The British began constructing blockhouses built within machine gun range of one another and flanked by barbed wire to slow the Boers' movement across the countryside and block paths to valuable targets. Such tactics eventually evolved into today's counterinsurgency tactics.

The Boer commando raids deep into the Cape Colony, which were organized and commanded by Jan Smuts, resonated throughout the century as the British adopted and adapted the tactics first used against them by the Boers.

World War I
 Lawrence of Arabia and British support for the Arab uprising against the Ottoman Empire. The Ottomans were the stronger power, the Arabs the weaker.
 Austria-Hungary's invasion of Serbia, August 1914. Austria-Hungary was the stronger power, Serbia the weaker.
 Germany's invasion of Belgium, August 1914. Germany was the stronger power, Belgium the weaker.

Between the World Wars
 Abd el-Krim led resistance in Morocco from 1920 to 1924 against French and Spanish colonial armies ten times as strong as the guerrilla force, led by General Philippe Pétain.
 TIGR, the first anti-fascist national-defensive organization in Europe, fought against Benito Mussolini's regime in Northeast Italy.
 Anglo-Irish War (Irish War of Independence) fought between the Irish Republican Army and the Black and Tans/Auxiliaries. Lloyd George (Prime Minister at the time) attempted to persuade other nations that it was not a war by refusing to use the army and using the Black and Tans instead but the conflict was conducted as an asymmetric guerrilla war and was registered as a war with the League of Nations by the Irish Free State.

World War II
 Philippine resistance against Japan – During the Japanese occupation in World War II, there was an extensive Philippine resistance movement, which opposed the Japanese with active underground and guerrilla activity that increased over the years.

 Winter War – Finland was invaded by the much larger mechanized military units of the Soviet Union. Although the Soviets captured 8% of Finland, they suffered enormous casualties versus much lower losses for the Finns. Soviet vehicles were confined to narrow forest roads by terrain and snow, while the Finns used ski tactics around them unseen through the trees. They cut the advancing Soviet column into what they called motti (a cubic metre of firewood), and then destroyed the cut off sections one by one. Many of the Soviets were shot by snipers, had their throats cut from behind, or froze to death due to inadequate clothing and lack of camouflage and shelter. The Finns also devised a petrol bomb they called the Molotov cocktail to destroy Soviet tanks.
 Soviet partisans – resistance movement which fought in the German occupied parts of the Soviet Union.
 Warsaw Uprising – Poland (Home Army, Armia Krajowa) rose up against the German occupation.
 Germany's occupation of Yugoslavia, 1941–45 (Germany vs. Tito's Partisans and Mihailović's Chetniks).

Britain
 British Commandos and European coastal raids. German countermeasures and the notorious Commando Order.
 Long Range Desert Group and the Special Air Service in Africa and later in Europe.
 South East Asian Theatre: Wingate, Chindits, Force 136, V Force
 Special Operations Executive (SOE)
 Provisional Irish Republican Army against British security forces in the Northern Campaign.

United States
Office of Strategic Services (OSS)
China Burma India Theatre: Merrill's Marauders and OSS Detachment 101.

After World War II
 First Indochina War (1946-1954) and Algerian War of Independence (1954-1962); both against France
 The Cuban Revolution of 1953-1958 became a template of asymmetric warfare.
 The Hungarian Revolution of 1956 (or "Russo-Hungarian" war) saw makeshift forces improvising lopsided tactics against Soviet tanks.
 Libyan support to the Provisional Irish Republican Army during the Troubles (1960s to 1998) and collusion between British security forces and Ulster loyalist paramilitaries.
 United States Military Assistance Command Studies and Observations Group (US MAC-V SOG) (1964-1972) and Viet Cong in Vietnam.
The South African Border War, otherwise known as the Namibian War of Independence (1966-1990) between the South African Defence Force and People's Liberation Army of Namibia.
 United States support of the Nicaraguan Contras (1979-1990).

Cold War (1945–1992) 
The end of World War II established the two most powerful victors, the United States of America (United States, or just the U.S.) and the Union of Soviet Socialist Republics (USSR, or just the Soviet Union) as the two dominant world superpowers.

Cold War examples of proxy wars

In Southeast Asia, specifically Vietnam, the Viet Minh, NLF and other insurgencies engaged in asymmetrical guerrilla warfare with France.
The war between the mujahideen and the Soviet Armed Forces during the Soviet–Afghan War of 1979 to 1989, though claimed as a source of the term "asymmetric warfare", occurred years after Mack wrote of "asymmetric conflict". (Note that the term "asymmetric warfare" became well known in the West only in the 1990s.) The aid given by the U.S. to the mujahideen during the war was only covert at the tactical level; the Reagan Administration told the world that it was helping the "freedom-loving people of Afghanistan". Many countries, including the US, participated in this proxy war against the USSR during the Cold War. It was considered cost-effective and politically successful, as it caused a drain on the resources and manpower of the USSR and turned out to be a contributing factor to the collapse of that polity in 1991.

Post-Cold War
The Kosovo War, which pitted Yugoslav security forces (Serbian police and Yugoslav Army) against Albanian separatists of the guerrilla Kosovo Liberation Army, is an example of asymmetric warfare, due to Yugoslav forces' superior firepower and manpower, and due to the nature of insurgency/counter-insurgency operations. The NATO bombing of Yugoslavia (1999), which pitted NATO airpower against the Yugoslav armed forces during Kosovo war, can also be classified as asymmetric, exemplifying international conflict with asymmetry in weapons and strategy/tactics.

21st century

Israel/Palestine
The ongoing conflict between Israel and some Palestinian organizations (such as Hamas and Islamic Jihad) is a classic case of asymmetric warfare. Israel has a powerful army, air force and navy, while the Palestinian organizations have no access to large-scale military equipment with which to conduct operations; instead, they utilize asymmetric tactics, such as: knife attacks, small gunfights, cross-border sniping, rocket attacks, and suicide bombings.

Sri Lanka
The Sri Lankan Civil War, which raged on and off from 1983 to 2009, between the Sri Lankan government and the Liberation Tigers of Tamil Eelam (LTTE) saw large-scale asymmetric warfare. The war started as an insurgency and progressed to a large-scale conflict with the mixture of guerrilla and conventional warfare, seeing the LTTE use suicide bombing (male/female suicide bombers) both on and off battlefield use of explosive-filled boats for suicide attacks on military shipping; and use of light aircraft targeting military installations.

Iraq

The victory by the US-led coalition forces in the 1991 Persian Gulf War and the 2003 invasion of Iraq, demonstrated that training, tactics and technology can provide overwhelming victories in the field of battle during modern conventional warfare. After Saddam Hussein's regime was removed from power, the Iraq campaign moved into a different type of asymmetric warfare where the coalition's use of superior conventional warfare training, tactics and technology was of much less use against continued opposition from the various partisan groups operating inside Iraq.

Syria

Much of the 2012–present Syrian Civil War has been asymmetrical. The Syrian National Coalition, Mujahideen, and Kurdish Democratic Union Party have been engaging with the forces of the Syrian government through asymmetric means. The conflict has seen large-scale asymmetric warfare across the country, with the forces opposed to the government unable to engage symmetrically with the Syrian government and resorting instead to other asymmetric tactics such as suicide bombings and targeted assassinations.

Ukraine

The 2022 Russian invasion of Ukraine has resulted in a classical asymmetrical warfare scenario. Russia's superior military might, including its vast nuclear arsenal and seemingly superior armored forces has not helped Russia surmount fierce opposition from the Armed Forces of Ukraine, which has inflicted severe blows against the Russian Armed Forces by relying on technologically advanced weaponry supplied by the west.

Semi-symmetric warfare
A new understanding of warfare has emerged amidst the 2022 Russian invasion of Ukraine. Although this type of warfare does not oppose an insurgency to a counter-insurgency force, it does involve two actors with substantially asymmetrical means of waging war. Notably, as technology has improved war-fighting capabilities, it has also made them more complex, thus requiring greater expertise, training, flexibility and decentralization. The nominally weaker military can take advantage of those complexities and seek to eliminate the asymmetry. This has been observed in Ukraine, as defending forces used a rich arsenal of anti-tank and anti-air missiles to negate the invading forces' apparent mechanized and aerial superiority, thus denying their ability to conduct combined arms operations. The success of this strategy will be compounded by access to real-time intelligence and the adversary's inability to utilize its own forces to the maximum of their potential, due to factors such as inability to plan, brief and execute complex, full-spectrum operations.

See also

 Civilian casualty ratio
 Counter-insurgency
 Counter-terrorism
 Fourth-generation warfare
 Free War
 Grey-zone (international relations)
 Guerrilla warfare
 Irregular military
 List of guerrillas
 Lawfare
 Low intensity conflict
 Military use of children
 Millennium Challenge 2002
 New generation warfare
 People's war
 Partisan (military)
 Political warfare
 Reagan Doctrine
 Resistance movement
 Scorched earth
 Unconventional warfare
 Unconventional warfare (United States)
 Unrestricted Warfare
 War amongst the people
 War on Terror
 Yank Levy

US organisations:
 Center for Asymmetric Warfare (CAW)
 Asymmetric Warfare Group
 Special Activities Division

Wars
 People's War in Nepal
 2006 Lebanon War
 Second Gaza war

Documents:
 Management of Savagery

References

Further reading

Bibliographies
 Compiled by Joan T. Phillips Bibliographer at Air University Library: A Bibliography of Asymmetric Warfare, August 2005.
 Asymmetric Warfare and the Revolution in Military Affairs (RMA) Debate sponsored by the Project on Defense Alternatives

Books
 Arreguin-Toft, Ivan, How the Weak Win Wars: A Theory of Asymmetric Conflict, New York & Cambridge, Cambridge University Press, 2005 
 * Barnett, Roger W., Asymmetrical Warfare: Today's Challenge to U.S. Military Power, Washington, D.C., Brassey's, 2003 
 Friedman, George, America's Secret War: Inside the Hidden Worldwide Struggle between the United States and Its Enemies, London, Little, Brown, 2004 
 T.V. Paul, Asymmetric Conflicts: War Initiation by Weaker Powers, New York, Cambridge University Press, 1994, 
 J. Schroefl, Political Asymmetries in the Era of Globalization, Peter Lang, 2007, 
 Kaplan, Robert D., Warrior Politics: Why Leadership Demands a Pagan Ethos, New York, Vintage, 2003 
 
 Merom, Gil, How Democracies Lose Small Wars, New York, Cambridge, 2003 
 Metz, Steven and Douglas V. Johnson II, Asymmetry and U.S. Military Strategy: Definition, Background, and Strategic Concepts, Carlisle Barracks, Strategic Studies Institute/U.S. Army War College, 2001  
 J. Schroefl, S.M. Cox, T. Pankratz, Winning the Asymmetric War: Political, Social and Military Responses, Peter Lang, 2009, 
 Record, Jeffrey, Beating Goliath: Why Insurgencies Win, Washington, D.C., Potomac Books, 2007, 
 Gagliano Giuseppe,Introduzione alla conflittualita' non convenzionale, New Press,2001
 Resnick, Uri. Dynamics of Asymmetric Territorial Conflict: the evolution of patience. Basingstoke, UK: Palgrave-Macmillan, 2013. 
 Sobelman, Daniel, New Rules of the Game: Israel and Hizbollah after the Withdrawal from Lebanon, Tel-Aviv University, Jaffee Center for Strategic Studies, 2004 [www.inss.org.il/upload/(FILE)1190276456.pdf]
 Sobelman, Daniel, 'Hizbollah—from Terror to Resistance: Towards a National Defence Strategy, in Clive Jones and Sergio Catignani (eds.), Israel and Hizbollah An Asymmetric Conflict in Historical and Comparative Perspective, Routledge, 2010 (pp. 49–66)
 Sobelman, Daniel. "Learning to Deter: Deterrence Failure and Success in the Israel-Hezbollah Conflict, 2006–2016," International Security Vol. 41, No. 3 (Winter, 2016/2017).

Articles and papers
 Bryant, G. J. "Asymmetric Warfare: The British Experience in Eighteenth-Century India," Journal of Military History (2004) 68#2 pp 431–469. in Project Muse
 Ivan Arreguin-Toft, "How the Weak Win Wars: A Theory of Asymmetric Conflict", International Security, Vol. 26, No. 1 (Summer 2001), pp. 93–128.
 J. Paul Dunne, et al., "Managing Asymmetric Conflict," Oxford Economic Papers, Vol. 58 (2006), pp. 183–208.
  A mathematical approach to the concept.
 Marcus Corbin Reshaping the Military for Asymmetric Warfare CDI website October 5, 2001.
 
 Vincent J. Goulding Jr. From Parameters, Winter 2000–01, pp. 21–30.
 Andrew J.R. Mack, "Why Big Nations Lose Small Wars: The Politics of Asymmetric Conflict", World Politics, Vol. 27, No. 2 (January 1975), pp. 175–200.
 Montgomery C. Meigs Unorthodox Thoughts about Asymmetric Warfare (PDF)
 Richard Norton-Taylor Asymmetric Warfare: Military Planners Are Only Beginning to Grasp the Implications of September 11 for Future Deterrence Strategy, in The Guardian, October 3, 2001
 Michael Novak, "Asymmetrical Warfare" & Just War: A Moral Obligation in NRO, February 10, 2003
 Toni Pfanner, "Asymmetrical Warfare from the Perspective of Humanitarian Law and Humanitarian Action", International Review of the Red Cross Vol. 87 No. 857 (March 2005), p. 149–174.
 Sullivan, Patricia. 2007. "War Aims and War Outcomes: Why Powerful States Lose Limited Wars", Journal of Conflict Resolution, 51 (3):496–524.
 Jonathan B. Tucker Asymmetric Warfare, a 6-page analysis, Summer 1999.
 Asymmetry and other fables, Jane's Defence Weekly, 18 August 2006
 David Buffaloe 'Defining Asymmetric Warfare'  September 2006
 Gates Assails Pentagon on Resources for Battlefields The Washington Post April 22, 2008
 Mandel, Robert. "Reassessing Victory in Warfare." Armed Forces & Society, Jul 2007; vol. 33: pp. 461–495. 
Mandel, Robert. "The Wartime Utility of Precision Versus Brute Force in Weaponry." Armed Forces & Society, Jan 2004; vol. 30: pp. 171–201. 

Warfare by type
Military strategy
Military science
Military doctrines
Warfare